José Iglesias may refer to:

José Enrique Varela, full name José Enrique Varela Iglesias (1891–1951), Spanish military commander
José Iglesias (baseball) (born 1990), Cuban baseball player
José Iglesias de la Casa (1748–1791), Spanish Roman Catholic priest
José Iglesias Fernández (1926–2007), Spanish footballer
José María Iglesias (1823–1891), Mexican lawyer and journalist
José María Martín de Herrera y de la Iglesia (1835–1922), Spanish Roman Catholic cardinal
José Santamaría, full name José Emilio Santamaría Iglesias (born 1929), Spanish-Uruguyan footballer
Julio José Iglesias Rouget (born 1972), Spanish goalkeeper
Julio Iglesias Jr., full name Julio José Iglesias Preysler Jr. (born 1973), Spanish singer and model